Izz al-Din Mas'ud (I) ibn Mawdud ( died 1193) was a Zengid emir of Mosul.

Biography 
Izz al-Din Mas'ud was the brother of emir Sayf al-Din Ghazi II, and the leader of his armies. When his brother died in 1180, he became the governor of Aleppo. When As-Salih Ismail al-Malik the titular head of the dynasty became ill, he indicated in his will that Izz al-Din Mas'ud should succeed him; when he died in 1181, Izz al-Din rushed to Aleppo, fearing that Saladin the sovereign of Egypt would  try to conquer it. When he arrived to Aleppo, he got into its citadel, took over all the money and the gold and married the mother of As-Salih Ismail al-Malik. Izz al-Din Mas'ud realised he couldn't keep Aleppo and Mosul under his governance, as Saladin was intent on gaining control of Aleppo, so he reached an agreement with his brother Imad al-Din Zengi II the governor of Sinjar to exchange Sinjar with Aleppo; in 1182 Izz al-Din became the governor of Sinjar. Saladin continued his hostility to the remaining Zengid power in northern Syria and Upper Mesopotamia until 1186, when hostilities ended. Peace was made upon the submission of Izz al-Din Mas'ud, who agreed to become Saladin's vassal. In 1193 he was residing in Mosul where he became ill and died. He was succeeded by his son Nur al-Din Arslan Shah I.

References

Bibliography

1193 deaths
Zengid emirs of Mosul
Year of birth unknown
12th-century monarchs in the Middle East